USFS Osprey was an American steamer that served as a fishery patrol vessel in the waters of the Territory of Alaska. She was in commission in the United States Bureau of Fisheries (BOF) from 1913 to 1921, and was the first vessel the BOF ever operated on fishery patrols in Alaska. Before the BOF purchased her, she was the commercial cannery tender Wigwam from 1895 to 1912. After her BOF career ended, she operated as a commercial motor tug with the name Foss No. 19 from 1922 to 1965 and with the name Kiowa from 1965 until she sank in 1978.

Early history 
The vessel was constructed as the  coal-burning commercial steamer Wigwam in San Francisco, California, in 1895. Under the ownership of the Alaska Packers Association, she became one of the first cannery tenders to operate in Alaska. At some point prior to her U.S. Bureau of Fisheries (BOF) service, the Alaska Packers Association rebuilt her to a high standard based on recommendations made by the Steamboat Inspection Service.

Bureau of Fisheries

Acquisition and characteristics 
After the United States purchased Russian America from the Russian Empire in 1867 and created the Department of Alaska, enforcement of whatever fishery regulations existed in Alaska fell to the revenue cutters of the United States Revenue-Marine, which in 1894 became the United States Revenue Cutter Service and was one of the ancestor organizations of the United States Coast Guard. On 14 June 1906, however, the United States Congress passed the Alien Fisheries Act to protect and regulate fisheries in what by then had become the District of Alaska by placing restrictions on the use of fishing tackle and on cannery operations in Alaska and authorizing the United States Bureau of Fisheries (BOF) to enforce the regulations. The BOF had no vessels suitable for fishery patrols in Alaska, and during the next few years relied on vessels borrowed from other United States Government agencies (such as the Revenue Cutter Service), on chartered vessels, and on transportation that canneries offered for free to BOF agents. This approach was not satisfactory for various reasons, such as the requirement for vessels of other government agencies to perform non-fishery-related functions, ethical concerns over accepting transportation from the canneries the BOF agents were supposed to regulate, and the difficulty of enforcing regulations when the local fishing and canning industry personnel warned one another of the approach of BOF agents who had accepted transportation on cannery vessels. Each year after the 1906 passage of the Alien Fisheries Act, the BOF requested more personnel and vessels with which to fulfill its regulatory and law enforcement responsibilities. By 1911, when the Alaska fishing industry reached an annual value of nearly US$17 million, it had become clear that the United States Government needed to make radical changes in how it enforced the provisions of the Alien Fisheries Act, including funding the acquisition of a fleet of dedicated fishery patrol vessels under the BOF.

In the autumn of 1912, the BOF purchased Wigwam from the Alaska Packers Association for US$13,000 for use as the BOF's first fishery patrol vessel in what by then was the Territory of Alaska and renamed her USFS Osprey. Osprey had two masts, a steam winch on her forward main deck, a pilot house on her boat deck with quarters for three crew members, berths for six crew members in her forecastle, and accommodation for four crew members in her after cabin, which was finished in Spanish cedar and had folding berths. Her galley and dining room were on the forward main deck below the pilot house. Her dynamo was connected directly to a high-speed Corliss steam engine. For fuel, she could carry 7.5 tons of coal.

Before placing Osprey in commission, the BOF had to await a Congressional appropriation to pay for a crew to man her, and meanwhile stored Osprey on the ways at Semiahmoo, Washington. The appropriation for a crew came into effect on 1 July 1913, and the BOF quickly relaunched Osprey at Semiahmoo, assigned a crew of six to her, commissioned her, and prepared her for her first voyage to Alaska as a BOF vessel.

Operational history

Osprey departed Washington on 8 July 1913 to steam north for her first season as a BOF patrol vessel in Alaskan waters. She was assigned Southeast Alaska as her operating area, with her home port at Juneau, Territory of Alaska, and by the end of 1913 had logged  as a BOF vessel. Each summer, she enforced salmon-fishing laws and regulations in Southeast Alaska.

The BOF soon encountered difficulties in operating Osprey as a patrol vessel. The Congressional appropriation to pay her crew required them to pay their own mess bills aboard ship, leaving crew members without enough pay left over to make employment aboard Osprey worthwhile, so crewing her with competent personnel was difficult. She could carry only 7.5 tons of coal, giving her only a  radius, far too small to patrol the districts assigned to her in a large area like Alaska, and coal was expensive in Alaska, costing US$8.50 to US$12.75 a ton. As a coal-burner, she emitted a cloud of smoke from her stack that could be seen at a significant distance, and with few steam cannery tenders in service in Alaska, the sight of smoke on the horizon was almost a sure sign of the approach of Osprey, giving fishery violators ample time to evade detection and interception. Her aging boiler, installed when she was built in 1895, required constant maintenance – although the BOF never replaced it – and her seaworthiness was in question. He described her as unseaworthy, confined to her dock on many days when her boiler was in need of maintenance, and dangerously unstable, unable to leave port whenever a strong wind was blowing. In 1915, after two inspectors found Osprey to be in a poor state of repair, the BOF believed that she would be condemned at Ketchikan, Territory of Alaska, but she avoided this fate and remained in service.

In the spring of 1916, Osprey took part in stream investigation work at Wrangell, Territory of Alaska. After spending the summer of 1916 on her normal salmon enforcement duties in Southeast Alaska, she departed for Seattle, Washington, in October 1916 to undergo repairs there. She remained in Seattle for the rest of 1916 and throughout 1917.

In January 1918, Osprey finally returned to Alaska. In the late spring of 1918 she came to the assistance of the boat Good Tidings, which had broken down during a storm, and towed her  to Ketchikan.

In June 1919, the BOF transferred Osprey to Southcentral Alaska, where she patrolled until August 1919. The BOF found her so unseaworthy by that time that it sent her to Cordova, Territory of Alaska, to be laid up, and decided to spend no more money on significant repairs to her. Plans called for her to patrol for the last time during the 1920 fishing season, after which the BOF would condemn and sell her. She was beached near Cordova in the spring of 1920 to have her hull cleaned and copper painted in preparation for patrol work in the 1920 season, but on 25 May 1920 she settled into the gravel on the beach, rolled away from the shore onto her side, filled with water, and became partially submerged. About a week later, the U.S. Coast Guard cutter  arrived to help. Osprey was refloated using a Bering River Coal Company scow and the water was pumped out of her. She patrolled off Southeast Alaska during the summer of 1920 and in September 1920 took part in salmon stream marking, bringing her BOF Alaska service to a close. In early 1921, USFS Auklet towed her to Seattle to be sold.

According to a press report, Osprey was sold for US$550 at a public auction held in Seattle on 14 April 1921, but a May 1921 BOF bulletin claimed that the highest bid on 14 April, US$515, was too low, and the ship was not sold until a second auction on 29 June 1921 resulted in a winning bid of US$700.

Later career
After her sale, the vessel became a commercial tug and may have reverted to the name Wigwam. By 1922, she had been resold to the Foss Launch and Tug Company, which rebuilt her to improve seaworthiness and replaced her steam engine and boiler with a  Fairbanks-Morse diesel engine. Renamed Foss No. 19, she performed tug and towing services in both Puget Sound and Southeast Alaska, based at Ketchikan during her Alaska operations. She was the first Foss vessel to operate in Alaska. In the late 1930s, she began annual voyages to haul oil to communities in Southeast Alaska. Her engine was replaced around 1940 with a new  Enterprise diesel engine powerful enough to allow Foss No. 19 to win many of the tug races she competed in during the 1950s.

On 14 May 1965, Foss sold Foss No. 19 to Pat Stoppleman. Stoppleman renamed her Kiowa and replaced her engine with a Caterpillar D343 diesel engine. In 1967,  Stoppleman sold Kiowa to Samson Tug & Barge, which based her at Sitka, Alaska.

Loss
While towing a raft of logs to Wrangell, Alaska, with the Samson tug Calumet in Southeast Alaska on 29 October 1978, Kiowa suffered damage during a storm. Calumet towed  her to Herring Bay on Frederick Sound in the Alexander Archipelago. The two tugs were still there on 30 October 1978, when the log booms broke up in bad weather, scattering the logs, and some of the logs tore open Kiowas stern. Calumet rescued her crew. Kiowa was valued at US$80,000 at the time of her loss.

References 

Fishery protection vessels
Ships of the United States Bureau of Fisheries
Ships built in San Francisco
1895 ships
Maritime incidents in 1920
Maritime incidents in 1978
Shipwrecks of the Alaska coast